Nabil Rajo is an Eritrean-Canadian actor. He is most noted for his performance in the film Boost, for which he won the Canadian Screen Award for Best Actor at the 6th Canadian Screen Awards, and received a Prix Iris nomination for Revelation of the Year at the 20th Quebec Cinema Awards.

He was born in Asmara, Eritrea. He emigrated to Canada with his family at the age of six.

In 2017, he received a Dora Mavor Moore Award nomination for Outstanding Performance, Male in the Independent Theatre division for his performance in the Coal Mine Theatre production of Tracy Letts's play Superior Donuts. He has also appeared in supporting or guest roles in the television series Man Seeking Woman, Remedy, Rookie Blue and Suits.

References

External links

Canadian male film actors
Canadian male television actors
Canadian male stage actors
Eritrean actors
Living people
Eritrean emigrants to Canada
People from Asmara
Best Actor Genie and Canadian Screen Award winners
Canadian Muslims
Canadian Film Centre alumni
Year of birth missing (living people)
Black Canadian male actors